Robert Chichester may refer to:

 Robert Chichester (politician) (1873–1921), Irish soldier and politician
 Sir Robert Chichester (died 1627) (1578–1627), Deputy Lieutenant of Devon

See also
 Robert of Chichester (died c. 1161), bishop of Exeter